The sulfate fluorides are double salts that contain both sulfate and fluoride anions. They are in the class of mixed anion compounds.  Some of these minerals are deposited in fumaroles.

Fluoride sulfates were first discovered by Jean Charles de Marignac in 1859.

Some elements such as cobalt or uranium can form complexes that contain fluoride and sulfate groups, and would be referred to as fluoro and sulfato metallates.

List

Minerals

Artificial

References 

Sulfates
Fluorides
Double salts
Mixed anion compounds